New Holland Pier railway station is a former railway terminus in North Lincolnshire, England. It stood at the seaward end of the New Holland Pier, which juts  northwards into the River Humber at the village of New Holland. Its purpose was to enable railway passengers, vehicles and goods to transfer to and from ferries plying between New Holland and Hull.

New Holland was a "railway village" in the sense that Crewe was a railway town. Expanding the dock, building the pier, the engine shed and the railway to it were promoted and started by the Great Grimsby and Sheffield Junction Railway, though by the time services began that railway had merged with others to form the Manchester, Sheffield and Lincolnshire Railway. For many years GCR laundry from restaurant cars and hotels was brought to New Holland for cleaning.

History

The station opened on 1 March 1848 following a Directors' tour of the ferry and route as far as Louth the day before.

Services in the early days were a mix of local and long distance. The line was seen as the gateway to Hull, with transshipment of people and goods being a mere inconvenience. Before long lines reached Hull via Doncaster, so passengers and railways alike realised that longer could be quicker and more convenient. After this the pier and railway eventually settled down to providing local services across the Humber.

These were:

Ferry from Hull to New Holland Pier then train:
 to Barton-on-Humber
 to Cleethorpes via Grimsby,
and, from 1911
 to Immingham Dock

The Immingham service ceased in 1963, but the other two survived until 1981.

A severe storm on 18–19 October 1869 damaged the pontoon at the end of the pier so badly that it sank.

On Sunday 13 January 1895 the pier and station at New Holland were destroyed by fire. It was later rebuilt.

From 1923 the pier and station were closed for reconstruction, reopening on 19 March 1928. The station gave the appearance of having two platforms with a siding between, but the western "platform" was a wooden roadway used by vehicles to and from ferries, passengers used the true platform on the eastern side of the pier. The central siding often contained one or two coal wagons from which a small road 'train' of tubs was loaded and taken down the access ramps to ferry steamers. Originally the station had an overall roof but this was later removed. The station buildings were made of wood and included a signal box and refreshment rooms on the more substantial eastern side.

Average annual traffic using the pier in its peak years was 30,000 passengers, 250 vehicles, 1200 cattle and sheep and 300 tons of luggage. Until the end of the Second World War, railway publicity, tickets and timetables rarely differentiated between the Town and Pier stations, with the July 1922 Bradshaw, for example, giving a single entry for "New Holland."

The station was closed and the ferry withdrawn on 24 June 1981 when the Humber Bridge opened. New Holland pier was taken over by New Holland Bulk Services who started a grain and feed import and export business in 1984.

When the station and the nearby  station were closed they were replaced by a new station called , south of the latter.

Route

References

Sources

External links
 The station and its history Disused Stations UK
 The station RAILSCOT
 The station Daves Rail Pics
 Lincolnshire Poacher railtour 1976 YouTube
 Railtour details October 1965 via sixbellsjunction
 Great Farewells Railtour 1980 David Wainwright
 The station and pier flickr
 Pier, railway and shipping Davenport Collection
 The Barton Line Barton to Cleethorpes CRP
 Aerial view of pier and railwaygeograph
 The pier, railway and paddlesteamers paddlesteamers.info
 The station on an 1886 OS map National Library of Scotland
 The station on a 1908 OS map overlay National Library of Scotland
 The station on a 1948 OS map npe maps
 The station and lines on many overlaid maps Rail Map Online
 The station and section of line railwaycodes
 New Holland from the air in 1935 Britain from Above

Disused railway stations in the Borough of North Lincolnshire
Former Great Central Railway stations
Railway stations in Great Britain opened in 1848
Railway stations in Great Britain closed in 1981
Humber
British Rail ferry operations